"Jim" is a popular song with music by James Caesar Petrillo and Milton Samuels (who also used the pseudonym Edward Ross), lyrics by Nelson Shawn. The song was published in 1941.

Two versions reached the Billboard charts in 1941, those by Jimmy Dorsey and His Orchestra (vocals by Bob Eberly and Helen O'Connell (this peaked at No. 2) and by Dinah Shore (No. 5).

It has also been recorded by Billie Holiday, Sarah Vaughan, Ella Fitzgerald, Aretha Franklin and many other artists. An instrumental version was recorded in 1964, by Oscar Peterson, featuring Clark Terry, for the album Oscar Peterson Trio + One.

References

1941 songs